Eukaryotic translation initiation factor 2A (eIF2A) is a protein that in humans is encoded by the EIF2A gene. The eIF2A protein is not to be confused with eIF2α, a subunit of the heterotrimeric eIF2 complex. Instead, eIF2A functions by a separate mechanism in eukaryotic translation.

Function 

eIF2A is a 65 kDa protein that catalyzes the formation of puromycin-sensitive 80S preinitiation complexes (Zoll et al., 2002).[supplied by OMIM] It may be important for translation initiation mediated by the HCV IRES under stress conditions, but this result has been debated.

References

Further reading